The  Point Lighthouse or Jack's Point Lighthouse stands near to Timaru at the east coast of the South Island of New Zealand.

Geography 
It can be reached via New Zealand State Highway 1 from the small settlement Scarborough. Approx  further landwards passes the South Island Main Trunk Railway the building.

Name 
The place is named after the Maori chief Hone (Jack) Tūhawaiki, who belonged to the Ngāi-Tahu-tribe.

History 
The lighthouse was installed in 1903 at its current location, when it replaced the insufficient beacon of Timaru harbour. It had been built in 1866 from cast iron and was used until 1900 on Somes Island in Wellington Harbour, until a new tower was built there. It was automated one year after being relocated and since 1930 it was operated without staff. It is still being used.

See also 

 List of lighthouses in New Zealand

References

External links 
 
 Lighthouses of New Zealand Maritime New Zealand

Lighthouses completed in 1866
Lighthouses completed in 1903
Lighthouses in New Zealand
Timaru District
1866 establishments in New Zealand
1900s architecture in New Zealand
Transport buildings and structures in Canterbury, New Zealand